Jordan Daykin (born 6 July 1995), is a British businessman and entrepreneur. He is best known for his 2014 appearance on the BBC Two business programme Dragons' Den, where he became the youngest and most successful entrepreneur to win investment when he secured £80,000 from Deborah Meaden for his plasterboard fixing invention. He was called "One of Britain's Leading Young Entrepreneurs" on City A.M.'s list of 100 Most Powerful Entrepreneurs in the UK in March 2016.

Early life 
Daykin was born in Trowbridge, Wiltshire, where he attended The John of Gaunt School. His parents split up when he was nine; Daykin lived with his father until he was 13, when he moved to his grandparents' bungalow because his father went to Sierra Leone for work. At the age of 13, he left school to be privately home-tutored.

Early businesses 

Whilst still in school at the age of 12, Daykin founded his first business, RS2Services, which sold game accounts and virtual currency to fans of fantasy role-playing game Runescape. A year later he started his second business, a nationwide tutoring agency called Tutor Magnet.

GripIt Fixings 

In 2008, shortly after Daykin moved into his grandparents' home, he and his grandfather Stanley Daykin set about converting the garage into a bedroom for him. Daykin wanted both a blackout blind and a curtain rail to ensure no light could break into the room. After Daykin and his grandfather broke several fixings and drill bits attempting to hang the curtain rail, he went to the local DIY store to find a better solution, but could not find anything suitable. That afternoon they both went to the shed, and created the GripIt invention. The fixing was soon successful in mounting a television on the wall, and Daykin spotted a gap in the market. Four years later a patent was granted for GripIt and the invention was taken to market.

In 2014, Daykin appeared on Dragons' Den and secured an £80,000 investment for 25% of his company from Deborah Meaden.

In February 2016, Daykin's net worth was estimated to be £10 million.

In July 2019 Daykin resigned as a director of UK Building Products Limited and left the company. In November 2019 the company successfully filed for a voluntary insolvency. GripIt has since secured a license deal with Charles Bentley a global distributor based in Loughborough.

Television and reception 
After Daykin's first appearance on the BBC Two business programme Dragons' Den in August 2014, he appeared on ITV's This Morning television programme. On 28 February 2016, he appeared on the BBC Two programme Pitches to Riches which looked at Dragons' Den's biggest success stories.

References

External links 
 GripIt Fixings
 Official Website

Living people
1995 births
English businesspeople
People from Wiltshire
People from Trowbridge